Dentaliidae is a family of relatively large tusk shells, scaphopod mollusks in the order Dentaliida.

Genera
 Antalis H. & A. Adams, 1854    
 Coccodentalium Sacco, 1896    
 Compressidentalium Habe, 1963    
 Dentalium Linnaeus, 1758    
 Eudentalium Cotton & Godfrey, 1933    
 Fissidentalium Fischer, 1885    
 Graptacme Pilsbry & Sharp, 1897    
 Paradentalium Cotton & Godfrey, 1933    
 Pictodentalium Palmer, 1974    
 Plagioglypta Pilsbry in Pilsbry & Sharp, 1897    
 Schizodentalium Sowerby, 1894    
 Striodentalium Habe, 1964    
 Tesseracme Pilsbry & Sharp, 1897

References
 

Scaphopods